Manvinder "Vindi" Singh Banga (born 31 October 1954) is an Indian businessman. He is a senior partner at the private equity fund Clayton, Dubilier & Rice.

Early life
Banga was born on 31 October 1954 in Simla (then in the state of Punjab) into a Sikh family, the son of Lt.Gen. Harbhajan Singh Banga, a decorated General in the Indian Army, and his wife Jaswant Kaur.

Banga graduated from the Indian Institute of Technology, Delhi in 1975 and did BTech degree in mechanical engineering. He earned a master in business administration from the Indian Institute of Management (IIM-A).

Career
Banga worked for Unilever for 33 years. He served as the chairman and chief executive officer of Hindustan Unilever. In February 2005, as part of a major reorganization of Unilever's upper management, Banga was elevated to the Unilever Executive, as the global head of the foods division and ultimately took over the HPC division as well - effectively running all of Unilever’s categories across the globe. He was also responsible for their sustainability initiative.

Banga is currently a non-executive director on the boards of Glaxo Smith Kline, Thomson Reuters and Marks & Spencer. He is also on the board of the Confederation of British Industry. He is a senior partner at private equity firm Clayton, Dubilier & Rice. He served on the Prime Minister of India's Council for Trade & Industry from 2004 to 2014. He was awarded the Padma Bhushan by the President of India in 2010.

Vindi Banga has been appointed as Chair of the UK Government Investments.

Philanthropy
Vindi is the Chairman the Marie Curie charity in the United Kingdom, one of the leading charitable providers of palliative care services. He is also the Chair and Trustee of The Karta Initiative, a non profit organisation.

Personal life
Banga's brother, Ajay Banga, was the Executive Chairman of Mastercard. He retired from this position on December 31, 2021 to join General Atlantic.

Banga has two sons, both based in the UK: Tavraj Banga, a senior executive at Helios Investment Partners; and Udaibir Banga, a private equity investor at CVC Capital Partners.

References

Indian chief executives
1954 births
Living people
People from Shimla
Indian Institute of Management Ahmedabad alumni
Unilever people
Punjabi people
Recipients of the Padma Bhushan in trade and industry
Delhi Public School alumni
Businesspeople from Himachal Pradesh